In the Royal Navy, a Divisional Transport Officer (DTO) or a Divisional Naval Transport Officer (DNTO) and later called a Divisional Sea Transport Officer (DSTO)  is a shore-based naval officer responsible for the efficient working of the transports and boats of the flotilla, division or squadron under his charge.

History
The Royal Navy established a Naval Transports Service on 22 December 1916  during World War I the Rear-Admiral Commanding, British Aegean Squadron had a divisional transport officer based at Salonika. These officers were part of the Naval Transport Service. In 1921 the Naval Transport Service was renamed the Sea Transport Service.

See also 
 Captain (D) afloat

References 

Nautical terminology
Royal Navy appointments